FC Sipar  is a Tajik futsal club based in Khujand. They currently play in Premier Tajikistan futsal league.

Chronicle

Trophies

League

 2017/2018 runner up
 2018/2019 runner up

Players

Current

Youth

Sponsorship
KMU  is the team's main sponsor. 

SOHO Bank

Joma Sports Equipment

Club Management

References

External links 

 
 Tv Varzish from Khujand
 Sipar won central Asia derby
 Bank of Beirut - FC Sipar report
 Fc Sipar - Mes Sungun report
 FC Sipar will be in group D - press conference
 Sipar aiming for more\
 Final Draw produces exciting groups
 Sipar again win

 Futsal clubs in Tajikistan
 Sport in Tajikistan
 Organizations based in Tajikistan